Canalispira olivellaeformis is a species of sea snail, a marine gastropod mollusk, in the family Cystiscidae.

References

 Jousseaume, F., 1875. Coquilles de la famille des marginelles, Monographie. Revue et Magasin de Zoologie Pure et Appliquée 3(3): 164-278; 429-435
 Kilburn, R.N., 1990. The genus Canalispira Jousseaume, 1875 in southern Africa (Mollusca: Gastropoda: Marginellidae). Annals of the Natal Museum 31: 215-221

External links
 Coovert G.A. & Coovert H.K. (1995) Revision of the supraspecific classification of marginelliform gastropods. The Nautilus 109(2-3): 43-110
 McCleery T. & Wakefield A. (2007). A review of the enigmatic genus Canalispira Jousseaume, 1875 (Gastropoda: Cystiscidae) with the description of three new species from the western Atlantic. Novapex. 8(1): 1-10

olivellaeformis
Gastropods described in 1875